At This Moment (also released as Move Closer and Kiss) is an album by Welsh singer Tom Jones, released in 1989. It includes the single "Kiss", a cover of the Prince song and featuring the Art of Noise, and a cover of Phyllis Nelson's "Move Closer", which was also released as a single.

Track listing

Charts

References

External links
At This Moment at Discogs

1989 albums
Tom Jones (singer) albums
Jive Records albums